Joosia is a genus of flowering plants in the family Rubiaceae. There are at least 11 species. They are distributed from Costa Rica to Bolivia with the center of diversity in Ecuador.

Species
, Plants of the World Online accepted the following species:

Joosia aequatoria Steyerm.
Joosia antioquiana C.M.Taylor
Joosia capitata C.M.Taylor
Joosia confusa C.M.Taylor
Joosia dichotoma (Ruiz & Pav.) H.Karst.
Joosia dielsiana Standl.
Joosia frondosa C.M.Taylor
Joosia longisepala L.Andersson
Joosia loretensis (Standl.) C.M.Taylor
Joosia macrocalyx Standl. ex Steyerm.
Joosia obtusa L.Andersson
Joosia oligantha L.Andersson
Joosia panamensis Dwyer
Joosia pulcherrima Steere
Joosia sericea (Standl.) C.M.Taylor
Joosia standleyana Steyerm.
Joosia ulei Steyerm.
Joosia umbellifera H.Karst.

References 

 
Rubiaceae genera
Taxonomy articles created by Polbot